Zaviyeh (also Romanized as Zāvīyeh) is a village in Ersi Rural District, in the Central District of Jolfa County, East Azerbaijan Province, Iran. At the 2006 census, its population was 479, in 143 families.

References 

Populated places in Jolfa County